Farrukhabad Lok Sabha constituency is one of the 80 Lok Sabha (parliamentary) constituencies in Uttar Pradesh state in northern India. This constituency covers the entire Farrukhabad district

Assembly segments
Presently, Farrukhabad Lok Sabha constituency comprises the following five Vidhan Sabha (legislative assembly) segments:

Members of Parliament

^ by poll

Election Results

Lok Sabha election 2019

Lok Sabha election 2014

Lok Sabha election 2009

See also
 Farrukhabad district
 List of Constituencies of the Lok Sabha

References

Lok Sabha constituencies in Uttar Pradesh
Farrukhabad district